Patrol torpedo boat PT-41 was a  of the United States Navy, built by the Electric Launch Company of Bayonne, New Jersey. The boat was laid down as Motor Boat Submarine Chaser PTC-21, but was reclassified as PT-41 prior to its launch on 8 July 1941, and was completed on 23 July 1941. It was used to evacuate General Douglas MacArthur from Corregidor at the beginning of the war in the Pacific in World War II.

Boat history
PT-41 served as the flagship of Motor Torpedo Boat Squadron Three, which was based in the Philippines from late 1941 to April 1942.  The commander of Motor Torpedo Boats Squadron 3 was Lieutenant John D. Bulkeley, who became one of the U.S. Navy's most highly decorated officers.  The Commander of PT-41 was Ensign George E. Cox, Jr., USNR.

PT-41 evacuated General (later General of the Army) Douglas MacArthur, Mrs. Jean MacArthur, Arthur MacArthur IV (their four-year-old son), Ah Cheu (Arthur's amah), Major General Richard K. Sutherland (United States Army Forces in the Far East Chief of Staff), Captain Herbert J. Ray (USN), Lieutenant Colonel Sidney L. Huff (aide), and Major C.H. Morehouse (medical officer) from Corregidor to Mindanao on 12 March 1942; about the escape he made his famous declaration at Terowie, South Australia: "I came through and I shall return".

After MacArthur's party left Mindanao, PT-41, along with the two remaining PT boats of the squadron (PT-34 and PT-35), established a new base of operations at Cagayan de Oro, Mindanao, supporting the American military forces defending Mindanao and the nearby islands from the invading Japanese throughout late March and early April 1942.

With no more torpedoes available for PT-41 to use, it was commandeered by the United States Army to patrol Lake Lanao, Mindanao. It was destroyed by the Army on April 15, 1942, to prevent its capture while being transported via road to Lake Lanao.

Popular culture
The exploits of PT-41 are portrayed in the 1945 film They Were Expendable directed by John Ford with 
Robert Montgomery, John Wayne and Donna Reed.

Awards
Army Distinguished Unit Citation 
American Defense Service Medal with "FLEET" clasp
Asiatic-Pacific Campaign Medal with one battle star
World War II Victory Medal
Philippine Presidential Unit Citation
Philippine Defense Medal with star

References

External links
Elco PT Boat – Photos of an Elco PT boat at the Battleship Cove Naval Museum in Fall River, MA
Battleship Cove Naval Museum Website – Home of two restored World War II PT boats

World War II patrol vessels of the United States
041
1941 ships